Randolph Hugh McKinnon (July 22, 1917 – c. June 10, 2006) was a provincial politician from Alberta, Canada. He served as a member of the Legislative Assembly of Alberta from 1959 to 1967 sitting with the Social Credit caucus in government. During his time in office McKinnon served as a cabinet minister in the government of Premier Ernest Manning from 1964 to 1967.

Political career
McKinnon ran for a seat to the Alberta Legislature in the new electoral district of Strathcona West as a candidate for the Social Credit party in the 1959 Alberta general election. He defeated three other candidates in a hotly contested race with less than half the popular vote to pick up the seat for his party.

McKinnon ran for a second term in the 1963 Alberta general election. He won a higher popular vote defeating three other candidates with a sizable majority.

After the election Premier Ernest Manning appointed McKinnon to the Executive Council of Alberta on July 31, 1964, giving him the Education portfolio. McKinnon ran for a third term in the 1967 Alberta general election. This time McKinnon would be defeated finishing a close second out of four candidates. He lost to Progressive Conservative candidate Don Getty.

References

External links
Legislative Assembly of Alberta Members Listing

Alberta Social Credit Party MLAs
1917 births
2006 deaths
Members of the Executive Council of Alberta